Melanoides truncatelliformis is a species of gastropod in the Thiaridae family. It is endemic to Lake Malawi. Its natural habitat is freshwater lakes.

The IUCN Red List of Threatened Species treats the species as a synonym of Melanoides polymorpha.

References

Fauna of Lake Malawi
Freshwater snails of Africa
Thiaridae
Gastropods described in 1885
Taxonomy articles created by Polbot
Taxobox binomials not recognized by IUCN